The Weapons Act 1990 is an Act of the Parliament of Queensland.

Purpose and administration of the Act
This Act provides for an administrative scheme to regulate the possession, use and trade of various weapons including firearms, martial arts weapons, particular knives, body armour and crossbows.  The Act is administered by the Weapons Licensing Branch of the Queensland Police Service.

References

External links 
 Weapons Act 1990, consolidated version, AustLII 

Queensland legislation
1990 in Australian law
Gun politics in Australia
Firearm laws
1990s in Queensland